Rohan Shankar is an Indian screenwriter who pens scripts for Bollywood and Marathi films. He has films like Luka Chuppi, Lalbaugchi Rani and Mimi to his credit.

Early life and education 
Rohan Shankar. was born on 6 April 1985 in Andhari Village, Chalisgaon, Maharashtra. After graduating from college he pursued a career in scriptwriting and acting.

Career 
In 2014 Roahn Shankar was finally hired by Director –cinematographer Laxman Utekar to pen the script of his second Marathi film Lalbaugchi Rani. The film starring Veena Jamkar in the lead role was released in 2016 receiving great reviews both from the critics and the audience.

Rohan Shankar's journey in Bollywood started three years later in 2019 with Luka Chuppi under the banner Maddock Films. The script was earlier titled Mathura Live as Rohan developed the script exploring various places of Mathura, Vrindavan, Agra and Gwalior. With a huge list of star cast including Kriti Sanon, Kartik Aaryan, Aparshakti Khurana, Vinay Pathak and Pankaj Tripathi, Luka Chuppi emerged a huge box office hit in March, 2019.

Rohan Shankar has also penned script for Suraj Pe Mangal Bhari directed by Abhishek Sharma under Zee Studios. He even made his debut as an actor with this movie. The film stars Diljit Dosanjh, Fatima Sana Shaikh and Manoj Bajpayee in lead roles. His next venture is a film under Sony Pictures titled Helmet, directed by Satram Ramani and starring Aparshakti Khurana, Pranutan Bahl and Abhishek Banerjee.

He is the writer of Kriti Sanon's much hyped film Mimi adopted from Marathi film Mala Aai Vhhaychy. The is his second venture with Maddock Films and third with director Laxman Utekar.

Filmography

Personal life 
Rohan Shankar married to writer Varsha Sharma on 12 March 2020. They have a son named Elaksh.

References

External links 
 
 
 

1985 births
Living people